Car Alarm is a 2008 studio album by The Sea and Cake, released on Thrill Jockey.

Track listing

Personnel
 Sam Prekop – vocals, guitar, keyboards
 Archer Prewitt – guitar, keyboards, steel drums
 Eric Claridge – bass guitar
 John McEntire – drums, keyboards, steel drums, percussion

Charts

References

External links
 
 Car Alarm at Thrill Jockey

2008 albums
The Sea and Cake albums
Thrill Jockey albums